Tara Smith is a professional hair stylist. Smith released her own line of natural and organic hair products in October 2008.

Awards 
2009, The Clothes Show Style Awards' Celebrity Hairdresser of the Year
2008, Kiss and Makeup Beauty Awards: Best Shampoo and Conditioner

References

External links

1973 births
Living people
British hairdressers